INXS: Never Tear Us Apart is a two-part Australian miniseries about the rock band INXS and was originally telecast on 9 February 2014, and concluded on 16 February 2014, produced by Shine Australia and airing on the Seven Network.

Synopsis
INXS: Never Tear Us Apart is based on the band's rise to stardom, and focuses on the events leading up to the death of its then-lead singer, Michael Hutchence, in November 1997.

In the early 1980s in Perth, Western Australia, the Farriss Brothers are playing covers at a club with Michael Hutchence on vocals. They are eventually kicked out of the club and their current manager changes the band name to INXS after seeing an IXL commercial then seeing an X and an S and combining them. The police start searching their house for drugs and find a half-smoked joint. Other band members are Jon Farriss, Andrew Farriss, Garry Gary Beers, Kirk Pengilly, and Tim Farriss. They eventually sign on to a record label thanks to Chris Murphy who becomes their new manager. He eventually gets a U.S. tour for three months. Flashbacks show a younger Hutchence being bullied at school and joining the Farriss Brothers band as lead singer. Hutchence starts to date Michele Bennett. He breaks up with her then starts going out with Kylie Minogue.

Murphy advises them to write an album full of singles where he has Hutchence and Andrew writing the songs. They write the single "Need You Tonight" and call the album Kick. Murphy sells the album without record label's consent. The album eventually becomes a hit. Hutchence breaks up with Minogue and begins dating supermodel Helena Christensen. While he and Christensen are out one night, he suffers a sucker punch to the face. He falls and hits his head making him lose his senses of smell and taste, as well as causing dark mood swings. Realising that they are not popular anymore, Murphy suggest that they turn to Grunge music, but they say no. The band takes time off to spend time with their families, while Hutchence begins an affair with  Paula Yates, who is married to Bob Geldof. The couple are followed around by the press so much that Hutchence punches a camera man. Paula and Bob go through a public and messy divorce, with Bob being awarded full custody of their three daughters.

Yates becomes pregnant and gives birth to their daughter Tiger Lily and they become a family. Murphy also resigns from INXS. The band and Hutchence get back together to make Elegantly Wasted and start touring again. After practice, in preparation for their 20th anniversary tour, Hutchence goes to his hotel room on 22 November 1997, where he makes various calls, including checking up on the progress of a potential custody agreement between Bob and Paula, which would allow Paula to bring Tiger and her other daughters to Australia for Christmas. However Paula informs Michael that the custody hearing is being adjourned until 17 December and that consequently she would not be bringing their daughter (not wanting to separate Tiger from her sisters) out to Australia. Hutchence angrily phones Geldof, blaming him for the outcome of the hearing and ranting, "She's not your wife anymore!". He then falls into depression and calls Michele for help. The next day at practice, INXS turns on the TV only to see the news of Hutchence's suicide. Tim is especially devastated as he and Michael had an argument and never had the chance to make up. The series ends with actual clips of the real INXS playing live.

Cast
 Luke Arnold as Michael Hutchence
Toby Wallace as a young Hutchence
 Damon Herriman as Chris Murphy
 Andrew Ryan as Andrew Farriss
 Hugh Sheridan as Garry Gary Beers
 Alex Williams as Kirk Pengilly
 Ido Drent as Jon Farriss
Nick Masters as Tim Farriss
 Samantha Jade as Kylie Minogue
 Georgina Haig as Paula Yates
 Mallory Jansen as Helena Christensen
 Jacinta Stapleton as Reen Nalli
Ali Ryrie-Golding as Julie

Production
The Mini Series was executively produced by Chris Murphy and Tim Farriss (INXS Guitarist).

Filming of the television miniseries took place throughout the second half of 2013, with post-production taking place in October 2013. The miniseries is the only biopic to have the right to use the band's music. The miniseries was aired in two parts on Sunday evenings, and commenced 9 February 2014.

Reception
The first part of the miniseries achieved a national ratings audience of 2.243 million, winning its timeslot. The first part aired against a television film on Nine Network entitled Schapelle about Schapelle Corby, which attracted 1.153 million viewers.

The second part of the series achieved a national ratings audience of 2.081 million, also winning its timeslot.

Impact on ARIA charts
The week following the airing, INXS's albums and singles had a resurgence on the Australian ARIA Charts.

Albums
 The Very Best – #1
 Kick – #2
 Live at Wembley Stadium 1991 – #17
 The Swing – #25
 Shabooh Shoobah – #33
 Listen Like Thieves – #36

Singles
 "Never Tear Us Apart" – #11
 "Need You Tonight" – #28

Awards and nominations

References

External links 
 

2010s Australian television miniseries
INXS
Cultural depictions of Australian men
Cultural depictions of rock musicians
Seven Network original programming